Kamikaze Shirt is the seventh album by Fischer-Z. Due to the critical praise the previous album, Destination Paradise received, Fischer-Z carried on in the same style for this album. Still focusing on political observational lyrics, the album is considered to be the darker half of Destination Paradise, dealing with the international "have nots" of the world.

Track listing
"The Peaches & Cream"
"Killing Time"
"Marlon"
"And This We Call Crime"
"Kamikaze Shirt"
"Polythene"
"Human Beings"
"Stripper in the Mirror"
"Stars"
"Blue Anemone"
"Radio K.I.L.L."
"Untitled Track"

Personnel
John Watts - lead vocals, guitar, keyboard
Hadji Wazner - guitar
Count Sinden von Sinden - bass
Dr. Smith - pianos, synthesizers
Steve "Svenson" Kellner - drums, percussion
Additional musicians (as credited on CD)
Kate, Sharon & Harriet - "big girl" vocals
Lucie, Emille & Leila - "little girl" vocals
Ian Porter - help & backing vocals on "And This We Call Crime"

References 

1993 albums
Fischer-Z albums